Miryang station is on the normal speed Gyeongbu Line, 55 km south of Dongdaegu Station. Miryang station is an important branch of the Gyeongbu and Gyeongjeon lines. The surrounding area is filled with numerous tourist attractions such as Ice Valley, Pyochungsa Temple, Pyochungbi, Jaejak Mountain and Unmun Mountain, as well as famous mountains called Yeongnam Alps. Especially in summer, there is a theater festival held in Miryang Theater Village and a cool ice valley without long clothes. It is a station that is the center of economy and tourism.

History
The station opened on January 1, 1905, to trains on the Gyeongbu Line. The building was destroyed by fire on February 12, 1962.  The station was elevated in its determined importance on March 3, 1972, and a new station building was completed on December 28, 1982. KTX trains on the normal speed Gyeongbu Line began services on April 1, 2004.

Services

Miryang station serves KTX, ITX-Saemaeul, and Mugunghwa trains on the normal speed Gyeongbu Line.

See also
 Transportation in South Korea
 Korail
 KTX

References

External links
Korea Train eXpress
Route Map

Korea Train Express stations
Railway stations in South Gyeongsang Province
Railway stations in Korea opened in 1905